Ștefan Lătescu (born 25 December 2001) is a Romanian professional kickboxer and boxer, and former Muay Thai and kempo practitioner, currently signed to Dynamite Fighting Show and K-1. A former amateur in two sports, Lătescu notched over 150 wins in amateur kickboxing, and is the youngest senior heavyweight champion in the amateur boxing history of Romania. He is still undefeated nationally in boxing.

As of 1 January 2023, Lătescu is ranked the #8 light-heavyweight kickboxer in the world by Beyond Kick.

Professional kickboxing career

DFS
Lătescu made his professional debut against Eugen Mailat at DFS 7 on March 5, 2020. He won the fight by a first-round technical knockout. Lătescu was placed in the Dynamite Fighting Show Heavyweight tournament immediately afterwards, as he was booked to face Ionuț Iancu in the quarterfinals of the one-day tournament, which took place at DFS 8 on August 20, 2020. He lost the fight by split decision.

Lătescu bounced back from his first professional loss with a unanimous decision win over Florin Ivănoaie at DFS 9 on December 4, 2020. Lătescu next faced Marius Munteanu at DFS 10 on March 10, 2021. He won the fight by unanimous decision. Lătescu would go on to notch two more victories prior to fighting for his first professional title, as he overcame Dževad Poturak by unanimous decision at DFS 11 on June 4, 2021, and Konstantin Gluhov by unanimous decision at DFS 12 on September 22, 2021. His four fight win streak earned Lătescu the chance to face Ionuț Iancu for the vacant DFS Heavyweight Championship at DFS 13 on December 15, 2021. He lost the rematch by a second-round technical knockout, as he was knocked down three times by the two minute mark of the round.

Lătescu made his Senshi debut against Olivier Langlois-Ross at Senshi 12 on July 9, 2022. He won the fight by a third-round knockout. Lătescu next faced Jakob Styben at Senshi 13 in September 2022. He won the fight by unanimous decision. Lătescu returned to Dynamite Fighting Show in order to face Sam Tevette at DFS 14 on October 19, 2022. He won the fight by a first-round knockout.

K-1
Lătescu made his K-1 debut against the 2022 K-1 World GP Japan Openweight Tournament winner Mahmoud Sattari at K-1 World GP 2022 in Osaka on December 3, 2022. He won the fight by a second-round technical knockout. Following this victory, Lătescu was ranked as the eighth-best light heavyweight kickboxer in the world by Beyond Kick.

Lătescu faced the 2022 K-1 Japan Openweight Grand Prix finalist Seiya Tanigawa at K-1 World GP 2023: K'Festa 6 on March 12, 2023. He won the fight via KO in the second round.

Championships and accomplishments

Olympic-style boxing
 Romania Senior National Championship (2020, 2021, 2022)
 Romania Youth National Championship (2018, 2019)
 Romania Junior National Championship (2016, 2017)
 Romania Cadet National Championship (2015)
 Romanian Youth Cup (2018, 2019)

Kempo
 Romanian Kempo Federation
Romania Youth National Championship (2017)

Kickboxing
Dynamite Fighting Show 
2022 Fighter of the Year 
2022 Knockout of the Year  vs. Sam Tevette
2021 Rising Star of the Year 
Fight of the Night (One time) vs. Ionuț Iancu
2019 Tellur Cup Winner
K-1 
Knockout of the Night (One time) 
 Senshi
Knockout of the Night (One time) 
 FRFK/FRAMC
Romania Junior National Championships (2014, 2015, 2016, 2017, 2018, 2019)
ISKA 
2019 ISKA Amateur Members Association World Championships Junior Gold Medalist

Muay Thai
World Muay Federation 
2017 WMF World Muaythai Championships Junior Silver Medalist
European Muay Confederation 
2017 EMC European Muaythai Championships Junior Gold Medalist 
2016 EMC European Muaythai Championships Junior Gold Medalist 
2015 EMC European Muaythai Championships Junior Gold Medalist

Professional kickboxing record

See also
List of male kickboxers

References

2001 births
Living people
Sportspeople from Iași
Romanian male kickboxers
Heavyweight kickboxers
Cruiserweight kickboxers
Romanian male boxers
Heavyweight boxers
Romanian Muay Thai practitioners
Kenpō